John Edward London (13 January 1905 – 2 May 1966) was a British athlete who competed mainly in the 100 metres.  Born in British Guiana, now Guyana, he won a silver and a bronze medal at the 1928 Summer Olympics in Amsterdam.

He moved to London as a child. At some point his family moved back to British Guiana, where London attended Queen's College in Georgetown.

Back in England, London studied at the Regent Street Polytechnic, where he joined the Polytechnic Harriers and was coached by Sam Mussabini.  He was elected captain of the sports club in October 1922.  He was an early adopter of starting blocks rather than digging footholds in the cinder tracks. He ran the 100 metres in 10.7 seconds to win the race at a competition between England and France at Stamford Bridge in July 1927, and then won both the 100 metres and the 200 metres at a competition in Paris in October 1927.

London competed for Great Britain in the 1928 Summer Olympics held in Amsterdam, Netherlands.  After equalling the Olympic 100 metres record of 10.6 seconds in the semi-final, he won the silver medal in the 100 metres final, behind Canadian Percy Williams.  He then won the bronze medal in the 4×100 metres relay with his teammates Cyril Gill, Edward Smouha and Walter Rangeley, behind the teams of the US and Germany.  He was the first to use starting blocks at the Olympic Games. He was awarded the Polytechnic Harriers's S. A. Mussabini memorial medal (Mussabini having died in 1927) and the Studd Trophy in 1928.

He was later coached by Albert Hill.  In July 1929, he became the first British sprinter to win the Amateur Athletic Association's 100 yards title since Harold Abrahams in 1924.   He was also a leading British high jumper in this period.  His athletic career was curtailed by a leg injury in 1930.  He joined a 4×100 metre relay for England against Germany in 1931, but was not selected for the 1932 Summer Olympics in Los Angeles.

After he retired from athletics, he became an entertainer, playing piano in the original cast of the Noël Coward's musical Cavalcade at the Theatre Royal, Drury Lane in 1931.  He also appeared in Will Hay's Gainsborough Pictures comedy Old Bones of the River in 1938.

He married at Marylebone register office in 1930, where his profession was recorded as "pianist".  He was later divorced and remarried in 1938.

With athletics journalist Joe Binks, he co-wrote an athletics coaching manual in 1948, The Way to Win on Track and Field, but the book was not a commercial success.

He later worked as a porter at St Pancras Hospital, and died suddenly from a subarachnoid haemorrhage.

References

Further reading
  Martin Polley, ‘London, John Edward (1905–1966)’, Oxford Dictionary of National Biography, Oxford University Press, May 2012, accessed 7 Aug 2012

External links

 London at the 1928 Olympics
 London at the 1928 Olympics
 London at the 1928 Olympics

1905 births
1966 deaths
Sportspeople from Georgetown, Guyana
Athletes (track and field) at the 1928 Summer Olympics
English male sprinters
Olympic athletes of Great Britain
Olympic silver medallists for Great Britain
Olympic bronze medallists for Great Britain
British Guiana people
Guyanese emigrants to England
Guyanese male sprinters
Medalists at the 1928 Summer Olympics
Olympic silver medalists in athletics (track and field)
Olympic bronze medalists in athletics (track and field)
Alumni of Queen's College, Guyana
Alumni of the Regent Street Polytechnic
Afro-Guyanese people
Black British sportspeople
20th-century Guyanese male actors
British male film actors
Black British male actors
Guyanese emigrants to the United Kingdom